Maddy Collier (born 14 September 1995) is an Australian rules footballer playing for Sydney in the AFL Women's competition. Collier was recruited by Greater Western Sydney as a priority player in September 2016. She played every match in her debut season to finish with seven games.

In April 2019, Collier joined expansion club West Coast.

In March 2022 it was announced that Collier will join expansion club Sydney, with the signing being officially confirmed in May. She was announced in August 2022 as one of Sydney's inaugural co-captains.

References

External links 

1995 births
Living people
Greater Western Sydney Giants (AFLW) players
Australian rules footballers from New South Wales
West Coast Eagles (AFLW) players